Axel Kruse (born 28 September  1967) is a German former association football and American football player. Kruse was born in Wolgast, East Germany and played for several Bundesliga football clubs.

Football career
As player of Hansa Rostock, following an away game in Copenhagen on 8 July 1989, Kruse fled to West Germany with the help of friends. He joined Hertha BSC. During the winter break of the 1990–91 Bundesliga season Kruse transferred to Eintracht Frankfurt. For the 1993–94 Bundesliga he transferred to VfB Stuttgart. In Stuttgart he experienced a bad first year. He just ten appearances, eight of which as substitute and received a ban for assaulting referee Hans-Joachim Osmers in a DFB Cup game.

Kruse joined FC Basel during the second half of their 1993–94 season under head coach Claude Andrey. Kruse played his debut for his new club in the home game in the St. Jakob Stadium on 4 April as Basel played in the Swiss Cup semi-final against Schaffhausen. The game ended goalless after extra-time. Kruse converted his spot-kick, but despite this Basel were defeated 5–6 after penalties. Kruse played his domestic league debut for them one week later on 9 April in the home game as Basel drew 1–1 against Yverdon-Sports. He scored his first goal for the team another week later, on 16 April, in the home game as Basel won 3–1 against Xamax. It was the first goal of the match and Kruse converted a penalty. Kruse's last game with Basel was the away match against Schaffhausen on 23 April, in which he also scored a goal, as the visitors were 4–1 winners. After this he injured himself and missed the remainder of the season.

Following his loan period, Kruse returned to VfB Stuttgart for two further seasons and he ended his active career after two further seasons with Hertha BSC.

After retiring from football, he played American football as a placekicker for NFL Europe's team Berlin Thunder from 1999 to 2003. during his stint, he won the World Bowl in 2001 and 2002.

He later worked as a pundit for German TV channel Sport1.

References

Sources
 Die ersten 125 Jahre. Publisher: Josef Zindel im Friedrich Reinhardt Verlag, Basel. 
 Axel Kruse at Verein "Basler Fussballarchiv" site 

1967 births
Living people
People from Wolgast
German footballers
East German footballers
East Germany under-21 international footballers
East German defectors
German players of American football
American football placekickers
Berlin Thunder players
Eintracht Frankfurt players
FC Basel players
FC Hansa Rostock players
Association football forwards
Hertha BSC players
VfB Stuttgart players
Bundesliga players
2. Bundesliga players
Footballers who switched code
DDR-Oberliga players
Footballers from Mecklenburg-Western Pomerania
People from Bezirk Rostock
East German emigrants to West Germany